On October 18, 2021, a referendum was held in Alberta, Canada on two questions, whether equalization payments should be eliminated from the Constitution of Canada, and whether the province should observe daylight saving time year-round. The referendum was held as part of the 2021 Alberta municipal elections and the Senate nominee election.

History

Equalization 
Canada was created as a federal state with a financial relationship between the federal and provincial governments. Currently, there are three primary forms of transfers provided by the federal government to provinces. The Canada Health Transfer is a per-capita transfer payment program in support of the health systems of the provinces and territories of Canada, and represents approximately 47 per cent of major federal transfers. Funds provided through the Canadian Health Transfer must be used by provinces and territories for the purposes of "maintaining the national criteria" for publicly provided health care in Canada (as set out in the Canada Health Act). The second form of transfer is the Canada Social Transfer, a per-capita transfer in support of post-secondary education, social assistance, and social services, including early childhood development and early learning and childcare, which represents 20 per cent of major federal transfers. The third major program is equalization, which represents approximately 25 per cent of major federal transfers. Equalization is intended to address fiscal disparities among Canadian provinces based on estimates of provinces' fiscal capacity—their ability to generate tax revenues.

The equalization program began in 1957 under Progressive Conservative Prime Minister John Diefenbaker to mitigate horizontal fiscal imbalance between provinces. Successive Alberta governments and popular opinion in the province have decried the equalization formula, noting that Alberta has not received funding under the equalization program since 1965. The current equalization formula was implemented shortly after Stephen Harper's Conservative Party of Canada formed a minority government after the 2006 Canadian federal election. Shortly before the election, Liberal Finance Minister Ralph Goodale formed the "Expert Panel on Equalization and Territorial Formula Financing" chaired by Al O'Brien—a former Government of Alberta deputy minister—to produce a report on the future of equalization. The report titled "Achieving a National Purpose: Putting Equalization Back on Track" was tabled in parliament in May 2006. The Harper government used the report as a basis for reforms to the equalization program.

The equalization referendum question asks whether Section 36(2) which expounds the principle of making equalization payments be removed from the Constitution Act, 1982. The amending formula for the Canadian Constitution requires agreement from seven provinces representing 50 per cent of the population of Canada (7+50 formula) and a "yes" vote by a single province in a referendum does not have legal consequence, as a provincial government cannot unilaterally modify equalization.

Daylight saving time 
In 1948, the Government of Alberta formally set the province's time zone with the passage of The Daylight Saving Time Act, which mandated the entire province observe Mountain Standard Time, and prevented any municipality from observing daylight saving time or any other time zone. The bill came after Calgary (1946 and 1947), and Edmonton (1946) held municipal plebiscites which approved the move to daylight saving time.

Alberta's urban municipalities were largely in favour of daylight saving time and pressured the provincial government to hold a provincial plebiscite or permit municipalities to observe daylight saving time. The effort in the Legislature was spearheaded by Liberal MLA and Calgary Alderman Bill Dickie who in March 1964 brought forward a motion to permit municipalities to hold plebiscites on the issue; the motion was defeated by the Social Credit government. At the time Social Credit MLA William Patterson described daylight saving time as "that fandangled thing", and Minister Allen Russell Patrick stated that municipal daylight saving time would be difficult for tourists to understand.

The Social Credit government finally gave in to the request for a provincial plebiscite on daylight saving time, approving a motion by Bill Dickie put forward in February 1966. On March 29, 1966, Minister Alfred Hooke introduced An Act to amend The Daylight Saving Time Act (Bill 75) amending the Daylight Saving Time Act to permit the government to hold a plebiscite on the issue. Alberta voters were asked the question "Do you favour Province-wide Daylight Saving Time?" during the 1967 Alberta general election. A narrow majority of 51.25 per cent of voters rejected daylight saving time, which were primarily located in rural areas, while strong support for daylight saving time was seen in Calgary, Edmonton, Lethbridge and Medicine Hat.

Across Canada, by 1967, each province besides Alberta and Saskatchewan had adopted daylight saving time. Many Alberta businesses provided for modified summer hours, including the Alberta Stock Exchange which started at 7 a.m. to align with exchanges in Toronto and Montreal. Air Canada released a statement expressing the difficulty of distributing flight schedules with flights to or from Alberta.

After 25 years as Premier, Social Credit leader Ernest Manning stepped down officially on December 12, 1968, and his successor Harry Strom was sworn in as Premier. Only a few months later in April 1969, Strom announced Albertans would once again be asked to vote on daylight saving time in conjunction with the next scheduled provincial general election. During the announcement, Strom stated he was neutral on the topic and did not have a preference one way or another. The 1971 plebiscite on daylight saving time resulted in an overwhelming majority of the Alberta population approving the transition with 61.47 per cent in favour. A statement from Unifarm, a farmer representative organization which opposed daylight saving time, admitted that the organization anticipated the proposal would pass, but also downplayed the consequences for farmers. The new Progressive Conservative government highlighted the change to observe daylight saving in the Speech from the Throne in early March 1972, and Attorney-General Merv Leitch announced on March 14, 1972 that Alberta would officially observe daylight saving time, with the first season's start date set for April 30, 1972, lasting until October 29, 1972.

Prelude 
United Conservative Party of Alberta leader Jason Kenney first promised in November 2017 to hold a provincial referendum on equalization, shortly after being named party leader in the 2017 United Conservative Party leadership election. The commitment to an equalization referendum was reiterated when the United Conservative Party platform document listed the referendum as the number three commitment in the leadup to the 2019 Alberta general election, behind the party's job creation plan, and the promise to repeal the carbon tax. The plan for a referendum came as a protest in the perceived lack of progress on new pipelines such as the Trans Mountain pipeline expansion. The United Conservative Party was subsequently elected to form a majority government in 2019, and on April 30 Kenney was sworn in as the Premier.

Fair Deal Panel 
On November 9, 2019 at the Manning Centre "What’s Next?" Conference, Kenney announced the formation of the "Fair Deal Panel" to consult with Albertans on how best to secure a "fair deal" for Alberta in Confederation. The panel was provided a list of specific measures to consider, and given a mandate to hold town halls across Alberta to hear the concerns of Albertans. Amongst the measures put forward for the Panel to review, included an Alberta Pension Plan, and establishment of an Alberta Provincial Police. Along with the Fair Deal Panel, Kenney sought to demand reform to the equalization formula to exclude non-renewable resource revenue from the calculation and impose a hard cap on equalization transfers, and hold a referendum on removing equalization provisions from the Constitution Act if substantial progress is not made on a coastal pipeline and Bill C-69 is not repealed.

On March 31, 2020 the Fair Deal Panel Report to Government was released outlining 25 recommendations to the government. The second recommendation of the Panel was to proceed with the proposed referendum on the question of removing equalization from the constitution. Premier Kenney responded by promising to hold the referendum on equalization, and continue to study the recommendation of creating an Alberta Provincial Police and pull out of the Canada Pension Plan.

Alberta’s election laws were modified to allow members of the cabinet to publicly comment on the referendum, which had previously been prohibited.

Reaction 

Commentators such as Trevor Tombe have argued the referendum on equalization is not held to facilitate constitutional change, but instead a way to elevate Alberta's position in Confederation and get the attention of the federal government.

Legal basis 

The legal argument for Alberta's constitutional referendum on equalization is based on the Supreme Court of Canada decision Reference re Secession of Quebec. In Reference re Secession of Quebec, the Court ruled that a province could not unilaterally separate from Canada following a provincial referendum, and the Court offered guidance on the response by the federal and provincial government on referendums on constitutional matters. In particular, the Court stated that "the clear repudiation of the existing constitutional order and the clear expression of the desire to pursue secession … would give rise to a reciprocal obligation on all parties to Confederation to negotiate constitutional changes to respond to that desire." As well as the statement following "[t]he corollary of a legitimate attempt by one participant in Confederation to seek an amendment to the Constitution is an obligation on all parties to come to the negotiating table."

There is disagreement as to whether the Reference re Secession of Quebec decision is applicable to the equalization referendum. University of Calgary political science professor Rainer Knopff believes the "binding obligation" described is applicable. Others, including University of Waterloo political science professor Emmett Macfarlane and University of Alberta law professor Eric Adams, argue that the "binding obligation" is entirely for provincial succession, and the Supreme Court opinion noted that provinces have a mechanism to initiate constitutional change through the amending formula.

The Government of Alberta position provided by Premier Kenney is that if Albertans approve a clear question it would result in a binding obligation on the Government of Canada "to negotiate that amendment with the province in good faith." The next step for the Alberta government would be to pass an amendment to the Constitution in the Legislative Assembly of Alberta, triggering the legal obligation for the federal government to commence formal negotiations to remove the section.

Questions 
On June 7, 2021 the Government of Alberta announced the referendum questions to be put before Albertans during the 2021 municipal elections. On August 9, 2021, two Order in Councils were issued under the Referendum Act finalizing the questions and election procedure.

The equalization question is: "Should Section 36(2) of the Constitution Act, 1982 — Parliament and the Government of Canada’s commitment to the principle of making equalization payments — be removed from the Constitution?"

The question for daylight saving time is: "Do you want Alberta to adopt year-round Daylight Saving Time, which is summer hours, eliminating the need to change our clocks twice a year?"

Opinion polling

Equalization
Should Section 36(2) of the Constitution Act, 1982 — Parliament and the Government of Canada’s commitment to the principle of making equalization payments — be removed from the Constitution?

Province-wide

Regional
Calgary

Edmonton

Daylight saving time
Do you want Alberta to adopt year-round Daylight Saving Time, which is summer hours, eliminating the need to change our clocks twice a year?

Regional
Calgary

Edmonton

Results

Equalization

Daylight Saving Time

See also
2021 Canadian electoral calendar

Notes

References 

Works cited
 

Alberta
Alberta referendum
2021 in Alberta
Economy of Alberta
Referendums in Alberta